Since it opened in 1852, there have been a number of accidents at London King's Cross railway station. Accidents occurring at King's Cross St Pancras tube station are not covered.

1855
On 18 January 1855, the axle of a North British Railway six-wheel carriage broke as the train was passing through Gasworks Tunnel. The cause found to be that the axle was made from defective materials. On 20 August 1855, a passenger train collided with the buffer stops at a speed of  due to driver error. Several passengers sustained slight injuries.

1860
On 30 May 1860, an excursion train collided with the buffer stops. About fourteen people were injured. On 1 November 1860, the boiler of a locomotive exploded. The locomotive formerly belonged to the Eastern Counties Railway and had been named The Albion. It had been sold to a contractor and was being used in the construction of the Metropolitan Railway. The crown plate of the locomotive's firebox was found to be defective. Two people were killed, and three were injured, with one getting a serious injury.

1865
On 2 November 1865, a coal train became divided at the station. The rear portion ran back and ran through the buffer stops. One person was injured.

1873
On 30 October 1873, a passenger train stalled on leaving the station and ran back. The following passenger train collided with it. Several people were injured, one seriously.

1875
On 22 March 1875, a passenger train was derailed entering Gasworks Tunnel. Some passengers were injured.

1878
On 8 January 1878, a freight train became divided. The rear portion ran back and collided with a passenger train. Three people were severely injured.

1881
On 9 April 1881, a passenger train collided with the rear of an empty stock train in Gasworks Tunnel. One person was injured.

On 15 September 1881, a light engine and a coal train collided near the mouth of Copenhagen Tunnel due to a signalman's error. One person was killed and one was severely injured.

1884
On 8 November 1884, an empty stock train collided with a rake of carriages. One person was injured. The driver claimed brake failure as the cause.

1885
On 30 June 1885, a freight train and a passenger train collided at the mouth of Gasworks Tunnel. No injuries were reported.

1893
On 23 December 1893, a passenger train ran into an empty stock train on leaving the station due to a signalman's error. Two people were injured.

1896
On 22 July 1896, a passenger train was derailed when leaving the station. One carriage overturned. Twenty people were injured; two people suffered broken arms.

1897
On 10 March 1897, an excursion train collided with the buffer stops. Twelve people were injured.

1901
On 28 December 1901, a passenger train and a freight train collided due to a signal displaying a false clear indication, having failed to  return to danger when commanded. Five people were injured.

1932
On 12 July 1932, a London and North Eastern Railway passenger train ran back in a tunnel and was derailed by catch  points, fouling an adjacent line. A London, Midland and Scottish Railway freight train then collided with the derailed carriages and was also derailed. There were no injuries.

1945
On 4 February 1945, a passenger train to Leeds and Bradford stalled in Gasworks Tunnel, ran back and was derailed in the station. Two people were killed and 25 were injured. Services were not fully restored to the station until 23 February.

2003
On 16 September 2003, a passenger train was derailed due to a signalman's error, compounded by a maintenance error. There were no injuries.

2015
The train was operated by Class 317 electric multiple unit No. 317 346. Fourteen passengers were injured.

2017
On 15 August 2017, a passenger train operated by a Class 387 electric multiple unit collided with the buffer stops on platform 9. Two passengers were injured.

References

Railway accidents and incidents in London
Kings Cross, London
History of the London Borough of Camden
Kings